Then and Now is a historical novel by W. Somerset Maugham. Set mainly in Imola, Italy, but also in other Italian cities, including Machiavelli's hometown Florence during the Renaissance, the story focuses on three months in the life of Niccolò Machiavelli, the Florentine politician, diplomat, philosopher and writer in the early years of the 16th century. The book was first published by Heinemann in 1946. It recollects Machiavelli's encounter with Cesare Borgia, who was the model on which Machiavelli based his Il Principe. Against that background, a love farce unfolds, in which Machiavelli tries to seduce the young wife of his host at Imola. The unsuccessful affair gave Machiavelli the idea of writing his first comedy, The Mandrake. Thus, Then and Now appears to combine the two best-known works of Machiavelli – The Prince and The Mandrake.

External links
 
http://catalogue.bl.uk| The British Library
http://www.goodreads.com/book/show/120581.Then_and_Now

1946 British novels
British historical novels
Cultural depictions of Cesare Borgia
Cultural depictions of Niccolò Machiavelli
Heinemann (publisher) books
Novels by W. Somerset Maugham
Novels about philosophers
Novels set in the Renaissance